Milton Kort (1917 – August 1, 2003) was an American professional pharmacist who dabbled in sleight of hand.

He was a hobbyist magician who seldom traveled outside the Detroit area and rarely performed. Yet he was a man whom the professionals and greats in magic flocked to see. Professional magicians like Paul Rosini, Stewart James, Dr. Jacob Daley, J. B. Bobo, Charlie Miller, Cardini, Dai Vernon and many more sought out Milt Kort and shared secrets with him. Innumerable authors of magic books and articles fell back time and again to his immense knowledge.

As a teenager in the 1930s, he worked as a demonstrator at Sterling Magic, owned by Harold Sterling. He became regarded as a fine amateur magician and thinker.

As a young man, he enlisted in the Army during World War II and became a supply sergeant. Eventually, he became a full-time pharmacist, opening his own store  Kort's Drugs.

Kort was good friends with coin magician J.B. Bobo, and contributed a majority of the work in BOBO's Coin Magic. A man like Milt Kort could fool and entertain an audience in even the most casual and intimate of settings. Milton Kort attended the local chapter of the International Brotherhood of Magicians Ring #22 in the Detroit, Michigan metropolitan area.

Kort had one simple rule, Kort's First Principle: Have Fun!

Published works
 Kort is Now in Session
 Off-color Card Tricks
 Kortially Yours
 Kort, The Magic of Milt Kort by Stephen Minch, 1999, Hermetic Press.

See also
 List of magicians
 Card magic

References

External links
 
 Milt Kort short biography
 International Brotherhood of Magicians Ring 22 History
 Kort is Now is Session bibliography
 Guest Speakers - Milt Kort
 Milt Kort Passes
 Milt Kort death announcement

1917 births
2003 deaths
American pharmacists
United States Army personnel of World War II
United States Army non-commissioned officers